The 1917–18 Irish Cup was the 38th edition of the premier knock-out cup competition in Irish football. 

Belfast Celtic won the tournament for the 1st time, defeating Linfield 2–0 in the second final replay after the previous two matches had ended in draws.

Results

First round

|}

Replay

|}

Quarter-finals

|}

Replay

|}

Semi-finals

|}

Final

Replay

Second replay

References

External links
 Northern Ireland Cup Finals. Rec.Sport.Soccer Statistics Foundation (RSSSF)

Irish Cup seasons
1918 domestic association football cups
1917–18 in Irish association football